A list of films produced by the Israeli film industry in 1969.

1969 releases

See also
1969 in Israel

References

External links
 Israeli films of 1969 at the Internet Movie Database

Israeli
Film
1969